Watkins House, also known as Shoo-Crymes Place, Crymes Place, and Bonis Est Farm, is a historic farmhouse located near Keysville, Charlotte County, Virginia.  It was built c1830, and is a two-story, three bay, frame I-house in a transitional Federal / Greek Revival style.  It has a rear wing and features a pair of tall hexagonal brick chimney stacks.  Also on the property are a contributing a tobacco barn, a wagon shed / granary, an equipment or storage building, a hay barn / stable, and a chicken coop.

It was listed on the National Register of Historic Places in 2004.

References

Houses on the National Register of Historic Places in Virginia
Greek Revival houses in Virginia
Houses in Charlotte County, Virginia
National Register of Historic Places in Charlotte County, Virginia